Ramgarh Cantt railway station, serves the city of Ramgarh Cantonment which is the headquarters of the Ramgarh district in the Indian state of Jharkhand. Ramgarh Cantt railway station belongs to the Ranchi division of the South Eastern Railway zone of the Indian Railways.

Facilities 
The major facilities available are Waiting rooms, retiring room, computerized reservation facility, Reservation Counter, Vehicle parking etc. The vehicles are allowed to enter the station premises. Security personnel from the Government Railway Police (GRP) are present for security.

Trains 
Several electrified local passenger and express trains run from Ramgarh to neighbouring destinations on frequent intervals.

See also 

 Ramgarh Cantonment
 Ramgarh district

References

External links 
 Ramgarh Cant station map
 Official website of the Ramgarh district

Railway stations in Ramgarh district
Ranchi railway division